Valentin Todercan (born May 13, 1961) is a Moldovan screen and stage actor, producer, screenwriter and director. Between April 10, 2007, and December 30, 2009, he served as president of TeleRadio-Moldova. In 2008, he was awarded the Order of Work Merit for his efforts in the development of the Moldovan public television. In 2011, he was elected councilor as part of the Municipal Council of Chişinău, and has been actively involved in the cultural development of the city.

Education and career 
Todercan was born in Corlăteni, Moldova on May 13, 1961. He was part of the first Moldovan generation of graduates from Moscow's Boris Shchukin Theatre Institute in 1985, and performed at Luceafărul Theater as part of its permanent group until 1988. In 1991, Todercan along with his Shchukin classmates founds The Eugène Ionesco Theater in Chișinău. He contributed to the organization of the first edition of Moldova's BITEI International Theater Festival between 1994 and 1997. With The Eugène Ionesco Theater, Todercan participates in a number of international theater festivals, including in Egypt, Japan, France, Great Britain, Poland, and others. In 1995, Todercan is appointed general manager at the Moldova-Film Studio until 2002, when he becomes in charge of the old Cinematography Department of Moldova. He then returns to Moldova-Film briefly in 2006 as general producer. He earned his master's of public administration around this time. Between 2007 and 2010, Valentin Todercan served as the president of TeleRadio-Moldova. On June 5, 2011, he was elected as councilor in Chișinău's Municipal Council, where he is due to serve until 2015.

Works

Actor

Stage
Waiting for Godot, Samuel Beckett, Eugène Ionesco Theater

Screen
"Codrii”
"Jocul de-a moartea”

Producer

Feature films
"Jana", Moldova, 2004
"Black Prince", Moldova, 2004
"A 12-a Toamnă", Russia, 2003
"Bucharest Express", USA, 2002
"Patul lui Procust", Moldova, 2001

Documentaries
9 documentaries, including:
“Petru Rareș,” 2006
“Ștefan – Cel mai mare ctitor de țară," 2004
“Dimitrie Cantemir,” 2003

Feature film screenwriter
"Fie pâinea...”
"Micuţa”
"Un cartuş pentru porumbel” (also known as Vînătoarea)

Film director
"Un cartuş pentru porumbel,” (also known as Vînătoarea), Moldova, 2007.

Awards 
 Order of Work Merit ("Gloria Muncii”), 2008.
 Order of the Moldovan Orthodox Church "Binecredinciosul Voievod Stefan Cel Mare si Sfint," gr. II, 2009.

Festivals 
 International Theater Festival "BITEI” ed. 1994, 1997, Moldova
 Belarus Film Festival "Zilele filmului belorus în R. M.”, Moldova
 Russian Film Festival "Zilele filmului rus în R. M.”, Moldova
 Cinematography Manifestation "Christian Documentary”, Moldova
 Scientific Conference "Cantemir and the Screen”, Moldova
 National Film Festival "Săptămânile Filmului Naţional”, ed. 2002, 2003, 2004, 2005, 2006, Moldova

References

External links 
 Boris Shchukin Theatre Institute
 Chişinău City Hall
 Eugene Ionesco Theater
 Teleradio-Moldova
 Member of The Theatre Union from Moldova (UNITEM)
 Member of UARF

Living people
1961 births
Moldovan male film actors
Moldovan male stage actors
Moldovan film producers
Moldovan film directors
Political office-holders in Moldova
Moldovan screenwriters
Film people from Chișinău
People from Rîșcani District
Recipients of the Order of Work Glory
Teleradio-Moldova
Actors from Chișinău